Lobstädt is a village and a former municipality in the Leipziger Land district, in Saxony, Germany. On April 1, 2008 Lobstädt was incorporated into Neukieritzsch.

Former municipalities in Saxony
Leipzig (district)